Rike Ruschenburg (born 20 June 1946) is a German volleyball player. She competed in the women's tournament at the 1972 Summer Olympics.

References

External links
 

1946 births
Living people
German women's volleyball players
Olympic volleyball players of West Germany
Volleyball players at the 1972 Summer Olympics
People from Moers
Sportspeople from Düsseldorf (region)